Trombino is a surname. Notable people with the surname include:

 Mark Trombino (born 1966), American record producer, musician, and audio engineer
 Paul Trombino III, American engineer and government official
 Peter Trombino (born 1985), American lacrosse player